Gari is a Japanese electro rock band, formed in 1997 in Tokyo. The band debuted on the independent label Deadstocksandwich Records in 1999. In 2005, the band moved to Victor Entertainment. In France, Gari performed concerts at the Japan Expo anime convention in 2007 and 2009.

Discography

Albums
 E・go・is・tick (2005)
 Masked (2006)
 Colorful Talk (2010)

Mini-albums
 Flight Recorder (2000)
 Neo Radio Station (2006)
 Tokyo Soldier (2009)

Remix albums
 Al・tru・is・tick (2005)

Singles
 "Brainshooter" (2000)

External links 

  
 MySpace 

Japanese rock music groups
Musical groups established in 1997
Japanese electronic music groups
Musical groups from Tokyo